Eph is an album by Fridge, released in 1999. It was their first (and only) album for the Go! Beat label.

The album was reissued in North America in 2002 on Temporary Residence Limited with an additional CD consisting of two EPs released in the same year ("Kinoshita Terasaka" and remixes of "Of" by the band themselves), plus two more recent remixes.

Track listing

Original and CD1 of Eph Reissue
"Ark"
"Meum"
"Transience"
"Of"
"Tuum"
"Bad Ischl"
"Yttrium"
"Aphelion"

CD2 of Eph Reissue
"Kinoshita"
"Terasaka"
"Of (Version)"
"Of (Remix)"
"Of (Edit)"
"Of (Dub)"
"Ark (Herberts Fully Flooded Mix)"
"Bad Ischl (Patrick Pulsinger Mix)"

References

1999 albums
Fridge (band) albums